Driss El Himer (born 4 April 1974 in Kezazna, Morocco) is a French long-distance runner.

He competed in the marathon at the 2004 Olympics, finishing 68th.

He finished 6th in the long race at the 2001 IAAF World Cross Country Championships, 11th in the 5000 m final at the 2001 World Championships in Edmonton, and 8th in the 10,000 m final at the 2006 European Athletics Championships in Gothenburg.

Achievements

External links

1974 births
Living people
Athletes (track and field) at the 2004 Summer Olympics
French male long-distance runners
French male marathon runners
French sportspeople of Moroccan descent
Olympic athletes of France
21st-century French people